Herina lugubris is a species of picture-winged fly in the genus Herina of the family Ulidiidae found in France, Portugal, Spain, Italy, England and Ireland.

References

External links
Images representing  Herina lugubris  at BOLD

Ulidiidae
Insects described in 1826
Diptera of Europe